TV Guides 50 Greatest TV Shows of All Time is TV Guides list of the 50 most entertaining or influential television series in American pop culture. It appeared in the May 4–10, 2002 issue of the magazine, which was the second in a series of special issues commemorating TV Guides 50th year (the others were "TV We'll Always Remember", "50 Greatest Covers", "50 Worst TV Shows of All Time", "50 Greatest Cartoon Characters" and "50 Sexiest Stars"). The list was also counted down in an ABC television special, TV Guide's 50 Best Shows of All Time, on May 13, 2002.

The 50 entries, chosen and ranked by the editors of TV Guide, consist of regularly scheduled series spanning more than half a century of television. TV movies, miniseries and specials were not eligible.

The special aired at 10:00 pm and was viewed by 8.9 million people, giving it a 6 rating and a 10 share. Considering the cover story for this special issue of TV Guide, it was the only one of the six to be presented on television.

Summary
The earliest aired show appearing on the list is The Ed Sullivan Show, which first aired in 1948. The most recently premiered show is The Sopranos, which first aired in 1999. The show with the shortest run is An American Family, which aired only twelve episodes and two subsequent special episodes. The longest-running show on the list is The Today Show, which has aired since 1952. 41 of the shows are prime time, five are daytime and four are late-night. NBC has the most shows on the list with 17, counting the final season of Taxi; otherwise, it ties with CBS at 16. ABC has eight, Fox, HBO and PBS each have two and The WB and UPN have a shared entry, Buffy the Vampire Slayer. Three are syndicated.

Top 10
 Seinfeld (NBC, July 5, 1989 – May 14, 1998)
 I Love Lucy (CBS, October 15, 1951 – May 6, 1957)
 The Honeymooners (CBS, October 1, 1955 – September 22, 1956)
 All in the Family (CBS, January 12, 1971 – April 8, 1979)
 The Sopranos (HBO, January 10, 1999 – June 10, 2007)
 60 Minutes (CBS, September 24, 1968 – present)
 Late Show with David Letterman (CBS, August 30, 1993 – May 20, 2015)
 The Simpsons (Fox, December 17, 1989 – present)
 The Andy Griffith Show (CBS, October 3, 1960 – April 1, 1968)
 Saturday Night Live (NBC, October 11, 1975 – present)

See also
TV Guides 100 Greatest Episodes of All-Time

References

External links
TV Guide Magazines 50 Greatest Shows of All Time on TV Insider

Lists of television series
Top television lists
TV Guide
TV Guide lists
2000s American television specials
2002 television specials
21st century-related lists